Geoffrey Kelly (born 10 June 1921) is an Australian international lawn bowler.

Bowls career
Kelly competed in the first World Bowls Championship in Kyeemagh, New South Wales, Australia in 1966  and won a gold medal in the pairs with Bert Palm at the event. He also won a gold medal in the team event (Leonard Trophy).

Kelly won the 1965 fours title at the Australian National Bowls Championships when bowling for the Coogee Bowls Club.

References

1921 births
Possibly living people
Australian male bowls players
Bowls World Champions